Yawgoo Valley is the only surviving skiing resort in Rhode Island. It is located on a hill in Exeter, south of Providence and opened in the 1965–66 season as "Rhode Island's first chairlift served ski area."

As one of the southernmost ski areas in New England, Yawgoo relies heavily on artificial snowmaking. Lift tickets range from $28 on weekdays to $45 on weekends. Yawgoo valley also offers a snow-tubing park with eight lanes and two lifts.

The area's title as the first lift service area in RI was appropriate, as it opened at a time where chair service was now expected of any ski area. As a result, a large amount of skiers went to Yawgoo Valley instead of the 4 other RI ski areas, who all still relied on T-Bars only.

While Rhode Island's other 4 ski resorts would close over the next few years, Yawgoo Valley's use of 2 chairs and keeping up with more modern ski area technologies such as better snowmaking equipment kept them operational.

They also operate one of only six tubing parking in the entire Southern New England area (RI, CT, and MA) for additional revenue from both skiers and non-skiers.

Trails 
Because of its southern location, the trails are generally easier, including the 3 blacks (though they are still not for beginners), as they rarely face the extreme weather and temperatures the resorts further north do, and is also less steep since it has a very small vertical drop (compared to most, though not all, other mountains in New England) 

Trail List:

Beginner:
-Novice Area
-Hub's Folly (Upper)
-Upper Ledges
-Crossroads
-Down Under
-TNT (Lower)
-North Forte
-Gnarnia

Intermediate:
-Hub's Folly (Lower)
-Yellow Jacket

Advanced:
-TNT (Upper)
-Lower Ledges
-Outback

References

External links
Yawgoo Valley – official site
Yawgoo Valley – NewEnglandSkiHistory.com

Buildings and structures in Washington County, Rhode Island
Ski areas and resorts in Rhode Island
Exeter, Rhode Island
Tourist attractions in Washington County, Rhode Island